Boone Valley Golf Club is a private golf club in Augusta, Missouri.

Details
The 18-hole club was founded by Robert Ross and was built by golf course architect, PB Dye, son of celebrated golf course architect Pete Dye.  In May, 1991, The Crawford Group headed by Jack C. Taylor, acquired Boone Valley Golf Club.  The 440 acre property is located 3 miles from the Daniel Boone Home in the Femme Osage Valley.

PGA Tour Champions host
From 1996 to 2000, Boone Valley Golf Club hosted the Boone Valley Classic, a Senior PGA Tour (now known as the PGA Tour Champions) event. In 2001, Boone Valley hosted the Enterprise Rent-A-Car Match Play Championship also on the Senior PGA Tour.

USGA host
In 2007, Boone Valley hosted the U.S. Junior Amateur Golf Championship and in 2017 hosted the United States Girls' Junior Golf Championship.  On October 5, 2017 the USGA announced that the US Girls' Junior Champion from the previous year be exempt from local and sectional qualifying for the US Women's Open (and US Open for the US Junior Champion) effective with the 2018 championship.

Scorecard 

Source:

References

External links

Buildings and structures in St. Charles County, Missouri
Golf clubs and courses in Missouri
Sports venues completed in 1988
1988 establishments in Missouri